Comet Mrkos may refer to any one of these comets discovered by Antonín Mrkos:
 C/1947 Y1 (a.k.a. 1948 II, 1948a)
 C/1952 H1 (a.k.a. 1952 V, 1952c)
 C/1952 W1 (a.k.a. 1953 II, 1952f)
 C/1955 L1 (a.k.a. 1955 III, 1955e)
 C/1956 E1 (a.k.a. 1956 III, 1956b)
 C/1957 P1 (a.k.a. 1957 V, 1957d)
 C/1959 X1 (a.k.a. 1959 IX, 1959j)

There is also the periodic Comet Mrkos:
 124P/Mrkos (a.k.a. 124P/1991 F1, 1991 IV, 1991k, 124P/1995 S3)

Comet Mrkos may also be a partial reference to:
 45P/Honda-Mrkos-Pajdušáková (a.k.a. 45P/1948 X1, 1948 XII, 1948n, 45P/1954 C1, 1954 III, 1954a, 1964 VII, 1964d, 1969 V, 1969e, 1974 XVI, 1974f, 1980 I, 1980c, 1985 III, 1985c, 1990 XIV, 1990f)
 143P/Kowal-Mrkos (a.k.a. 143P/1984 H1, 1984 X, 1984n, 143P/1984 JD, 1984 X, 1984n, 143P/2000 ET90)
 Comet Mrkos-Honda, C/1953 G1 (a.k.a. 1953 III, 1953a)
 Comet Pajdušáková-Mrkos, C/1948 E1 (a.k.a. 1948 V, 1948d)
 18D/Perrine-Mrkos, (a.k.a. 18D/1896 X1, 1896 VII, 1896g, 18D/1909 P1, 1909 III, 1909b, 18D/1955 U1, 1955 VII, 1955i, 1962 I, 1961h, 1968 VIII, 1968h)